A. N. Shamseer (born 24 May 1977) is an Indian politician who is the Speaker of the Kerala Legislative Assembly since 2022. He represents Thalassery State Assembly Constituency since 2016. He was the CPI(M) nominee for Lok Sabha in the Vadakara Lok Sabha constituency in the 2014 Indian general election and is Kerala State Committee member of the Communist Party of India (Marxist) (CPI(M)). He was the former President of Kerala lobby of the Democratic Youth Federation of India (DYFI).

Speaker of Kerala Legislative Assembly
He is elected as the 24th   Speaker  of Kerala Legislative Assembly on 12th September 2022 after defeating Mr. Anwar Sadath on a margin of 96-40.

Personal life
A. N. Shamseer was born to Shri Usman Komath and Smt. A. N. Sareena in Kodiyeri, Thalassery, Kannur. He did his schooling in BEMP high school, Thalassery and subsequently completed his pre-degree from Government Brennen College, Thalassery. He holds master's degrees in law (LL.M) and Anthropology from Kannur University Campus.

Political career
A. N. Shamseer entered into politics as a Students' Federation of India (SFI) activist during his school days. He was part of the leadership of SFI right from school to the all India level. He was elected as College Union General Secretary, Govt. Brennen College, Thalassery in 1995.

Shamseer was the first Chairman of the Kannur University Union in 1998. He was the President, S.F.I. Kannur District Committee in 2003. He was elected as the state secretary of SFI in 2008 and All India Joint Secretary of S.F.I. Later he moved onto DYFI and became  Kannur District President in 2012. Shamseer contested General Election to Loksabha in April 2014 as the CPI(M) candidate from Vatakara (Lok Sabha constituency) in Kerala but lost with a margin of 3306 votes. He was the president of the DYFI Kerala state committee between 2016 and 2018.

Controversies

In April 2021, with the election code of conduct in place, there is a quick move to appoint his wife in violation of the rules. The complaint is that there is a move to appoint the MLA’s wife in Kannur University in violation of the rules. The interview is for the permanent post of Assistant Director at UGC HRD Centre.
In January 2021, a complaint has been raised against Dr PM Shahala, wife of AN Shamseer MLA, regarding an illegal attempt to appoint her in Calicut University. The Save University campaign has complained to the governor about this. According to the complaint, Dr P Kelu, who was Shahala's research guide, has been appointed to the interview board to interview her.
In August 2019, the Police investigation team probing the case of attempted murder of former CPM leader COT Nazeer, took a car used by MLA A N Shamseer into custody, following charges that it was in the Innova car the accused hatched the conspiracy to attack Nazeer.
 In July 2018, the Kannur University has used caste rotation as an excuse to appoint A. N. Shamseer MLA's wife Sahala Shamseer, as Assistant Professor on contract basis in the Department of Pedagogical Sciences as Assistant Professor.
 In July 2017, A N Shamseer's photo being imprinted on calendars distributed in government schools in Thalassery, his constituency. The calendars also bear the caption “Nammude kunjungal thottadutha pothuvidhyalathilekku” (our kids to the near by public schools). The calendars were distributed as part of an educational project “Ellarum Schoolinu Oppam” led by the MLA in his constituency.
 In 2012, Shamseer issued threats against the police in a speech while he was DYFI's Kannur district president. He was tried in 2016, and sentenced to three months in prison and a ₹2000 fine for criminal intimidation.

Activities 
Special Interests:             Reading

Part Time Recreations:    Cricket

References

1977 births
Living people
Communist Party of India (Marxist) politicians from Kerala
Politicians from Kannur
Communist Party of India (Marxist) candidates in the 2014 Indian general election
People from Thalassery
Kerala MLAs 2016–2021